Barnby is a civil parish in the Scarborough district of North Yorkshire, England.  According to the 2001 UK census, the parish had a population of 79. As the civil parish population remained less than 100 at the 2011 census, all details were included in the civil parish of Mickleby.

The parish includes the hamlets of East Barnby and West Barnby.

References

Civil parishes in North Yorkshire